Cheesequake may refer to the following places in New Jersey:
Cheesequake, New Jersey
Cheesequake State Park